Daviess County  is a county in the U.S. state of Indiana.  As of the 2010 United States Census, the population was 31,648. The county seat is Washington. About 15% of the county's population is Amish of Swiss origin, as of 2017.

History
After the American Revolutionary War was settled, the fledgling nation created the Northwest Territory, tentatively divided into two counties. The area that would become the state of Indiana in 1816 was included in the original Knox County. As the area became more settled, Knox was partitioned into smaller counties, the last of which was the present-day Daviess, authorized on 2 February 1818. The boundaries of Daviess were reduced on 21 December 1818 by the formation of Owen County, and on 17 January 1820 by the formation of Martin County. It has retained its present boundary since 1820.

Daviess County was named for Major Joseph Hamilton Daveiss, U.S. District Attorney for Kentucky, killed at the Battle of Tippecanoe in 1811. The earliest settlements were along the White River, which allowed crops and timber to be transported to distant markets. The northeast part of the county was heavily forested, and timber industry flourished in the first half of the nineteenth century. Daviess County shares its namesake with another nearby Daviess County of Kentucky. Both Counties are in the Illinois-Indiana-Kentucky Tri-State Area.

Geography
The terrain of Daviess County is hilly, with its area completely devoted to agriculture or urban development. Its highest elevation (740'/266 meters ASL) is a rise one mile (1.6 km) NNE of Farlen. The county is drained by the White River flowing to the southwest, whose two main forks (East White and West White) come together at the county's SW corner. The county's west boundary is defined by the West White River's course and its south boundary is defined by the East White River's course; their confluence defines the county's corner point.

Adjacent counties

 Greene County - north
 Martin County - east
 Dubois County - southeast
 Pike County - southwest
 Knox County - west

Major highways

Climate and weather

Demographics

As of the 2010 United States Census, there were 31,648 people, 11,329 households, and 8,116 families in the county. The racial makeup of the county was 95.0% white, 0.5% black or African American, 0.5% Asian, 0.2% American Indian, 2.6% from other races, and 1.1% from two or more races. Those of Hispanic or Latino origin made up 4.2% of the population. In terms of ancestry, 31.4% were German, 13.1% were Irish, 10.8% were American, and 10.6% were English.

Of the 11,329 households, 36.8% had children under the age of 18 living with them, 57.1% were married couples living together, 10.0% had a female householder with no husband present, 28.4% were non-families, and 24.6% of all households were made up of individuals. The average household size was 2.74 and the average family size was 3.29. The median age was 35.4 years.

The median income for a household in the county was $47,697 and the median income for a family was $53,769. Males had a median income of $36,405 versus $29,652 for females. The per capita income for the county was $20,254. About 7.6% of families and 12.3% of the population were below the poverty line, including 16.7% of those under age 18 and 7.6% of those age 65 or over.

2020 census

Amish community
The Amish (Swiss Amish) community in Daviess County, established in 1868, had a total population of 4,855 people (in 29 congregations) in 2017 or 14.6% of the county's population, stretching along the eastern side of the county from Alfordsville, to Cannelburg and Montgomery to Odon.

Communities

City
 Washington

Towns

 Alfordsville
 Cannelburg
 Elnora
 Montgomery
 Odon
 Plainville

Census-designated place
 Raglesville

Other unincorporated places

 Black Oak
 Capehart
 Cornettsville
 Corning
 Epsom
 Farlen
 Glendale
 Graham
 Hudsonville
 Jordan
 Maysville
 Pennyville
 South Washington

Townships

 Barr
 Bogard
 Elmore
 Harrison
 Madison
 Reeve
 Steele
 Van Buren
 Veale
 Washington

Government

The county government is a constitutional body, and is granted specific powers by the Constitution of Indiana, and by the Indiana Code. The county council is the legislative branch of the county government and controls spending and revenue collection in the county. Representatives are elected from county districts. The council members serve four-year terms. They are responsible for setting salaries, the annual budget, and special spending. The council also has limited authority to impose local taxes, in the form of an income and property tax that is subject to state level approval, excise taxes, and service taxes.

A board of commissioners constitutes the county's executive body. Commissioners are elected county-wide, in staggered four-year terms. One commissioner serves as president. The board executes the council's legislative acts, collects revenue, and manages the county's government functions.

The county maintains a small claims court that can handle some civil cases. The judge on the court is elected to a term of four years and must be a member of the Indiana Bar Association. The judge is assisted by a constable who is also elected to a four-year term. In some cases, court decisions can be appealed to the state level circuit court.

The county has other elected offices, including sheriff, coroner, auditor, treasurer, recorder, surveyor, and circuit court clerk. Each of these elected officers serves a term of four years and oversees a different part of county government. Members elected to county government positions are required to declare party affiliations and to be residents of the county.

Each township has a trustee who administers rural fire protection and ambulance service, provides poor relief, manages cemetery care, and performs farm assessment, among other duties. The trustee is assisted in these duties by a three-member township board. The trustees and board members are elected to four-year terms.

Daviess County is part of Indiana's 8th congressional district; Indiana Senate districts 39 and 48; and Indiana House of Representatives districts 45, 63 and 64.

Political Culture

See also
 National Register of Historic Places listings in Daviess County, Indiana

References

 
Indiana counties
1818 establishments in Indiana
Populated places established in 1818
Southwestern Indiana